Faithful and Virtuous Night is a poetry collection by Louise Glück, published in 2014.

Composition and contents
The collection alternates between traditional poems and paragraph-long prose poems, marking the first inclusion of prose poems in a book by Glück.

Kathryn Davis, a friend of Glück's, read the collection's poems as they were written. She suggested Glück compose and include its prose poems. Glück drew inspiration from the short works of Franz Kafka while writing the collection.

Reception
In Boston Review, Craig Morgan Teicher wrote that the collection "[...] may be Glück’s strangest work yet, the hardest to describe or put in line with the others." Writing for NPR, Annalisa Quinn both praise and criticized the collection's abstruseness, referring to the prose poems as "blandly koanic" while also writing that some of the "[...] poems' incompleteness and inscrutability are suggestive rather than prohibitive."

Honors and awards
Glück received the National Book Award for Poetry for the collection. It was also shortlisted for the T. S. Eliot Prize.

References

2014 poetry books
American poetry collections
National Book Award for Poetry winning works
Farrar, Straus and Giroux books